John Dwight Bullock (1836–1914) was a member of the Wisconsin State Assembly.

Biography
Bullock was born on August 5, 1836 in Ephratah, New York. He moved to Johnson Creek, Wisconsin in 1861.

Career
Bullock was a member of the Assembly during the 1878, 1879, 1880 and 1881 sessions. He was a Republican.

References

1836 births
1914 deaths
People from Fulton County, New York
People from Johnson Creek, Wisconsin
Republican Party members of the Wisconsin State Assembly